David B. Fairlie (born in South Queensferry, Scotland, 1935) is a British mathematician and  theoretical physicist, Professor Emeritus at the
University of Durham (UK).

He was educated in mathematical physics at the University of Edinburgh (BSc 1957),
and  he earned a PhD at the University of Cambridge in 1960, under the 
supervision of John Polkinghorne. After postdoctoral training at Princeton University
and Cambridge, he was lecturer in St. Andrews (1962–64) and at Durham University 
(1964), retiring as Professor (2000). 
 
He has made numerous influential contributions in particle and mathematical physics, 
notably in the early formulation of string theory, as well as the determination of the weak mixing angle in extra dimensions, infinite-dimensional Lie algebras, classical solutions of gauge theories,
 higher-dimensional 
gauge theories, and 
deformation quantization.  
 
He has co-authored several volumes, notably on quantum mechanics in phase space.

References

1935 births
Alumni of the University of Cambridge
Alumni of the University of Edinburgh
British physicists
Living people
Mathematical physicists
Theoretical physicists
Academics of Durham University